Sendia massacre was a massacre of unarmed Bengali Hindus in Sendia village in undivided Faridpur district on 20 May 1971 by the Pakistan Army.< 127 Bengali Hindu men, women and children were killed in the massacre. The killers did not spare even the pregnant women, children or the elderly people. 76 out of the 127 victims were women.

Background 
At present, the village of Sendia falls under Khalia Union of Rajoir Upazila in Madaripur District under Dhaka Division. Sendia is just  from the Madaripur District headquarters. In 1971, Madaripur District was a sub-division under the undivided Faridpur District. At that time, there were very less motorable roads and hence the waterways constituted the main thoroughfares of the region. Steamers and country boats were the primary modes of transport. The region around Sendia in Rajoir Upazila was the birthplace of eminent Bengali Hindu political leaders of yore like Ambica Charan Mazumdar, Gour Chandra Bala, Phani Bhusan Majumdar among others. Historically, the present Rajoir Upazila had always been a Hindu majority region. During the Operation Searchlight, the Pakistan Army had set up an army camp at Tekerhat steamer station, in Rajoir Upazila.

Killings 
The date of the incident in various accounts is given as 5 Jaistha 1378 in the Bengali calendar, which is either 19 May or 20 May 1971 depending on whether it is the traditional Bengali calendar or standardized Bengali calendar. On the day of the incident at around 9AM, a contingent of the Pakistan Army from the Tekerhat army camp, set out in a launch and got down at Bhennabari, presently under Gopalganj District. They started firing and arson at Char Chamta and proceeded through Kadambari Union under  Madaripur District and resorted to a massacre at Ullabari. From there they proceeded towards Sendia, firing indiscriminately and committing arson along the way.

At around 4PM, the Pakistani Army along with their collaborators arrived in Sendia village. The Hindus from the nearby villages of Khalia, Palita and Chhatianbari villages took shelter the sugarcane fields in Sendia, after hearing gunshots. When the Pakistan Army entered Sendia, it was almost deserted. The Pakistani soldiers and their local collaborators looted the village and set it on fire. One elderly woman was burnt alive. The remaining villagers were taken captives, blind folded and hands tied, they were tortured to death at six different spots in the village. When the army contingent was about to leave, a goat's cry blew up the villagers cover in the sugarcane fields. The Pakistan Army opened fire from their semi-automatic weapons killing more than a hundred Bengali Hindus on the spot. Six days later five more persons were killed. Later, the survivors buried the dead bodies in six mass graves.

Aftermath 
A four-month-old child that had survived the massacre while its parents had died was adopted by Father Marino Reagan, from a Christian mission located at Baniarchar, now in Gopalganj District. Reagan later took the child to the United States, where he raised him. In 2009, he took the initiative to construct a plaque commemorating the victims that was inaugurated by Marino Reagan.

On 28 March 2010, a case was filed against BNP leader Moni Howlader, Mohammed Rafique Howlader and Sarwar Howlader and another dozen of unnamed armed Razakars at the Madaripur District Chief Judicial Magistrate Court. In the case file, the accused has been mentioned for their direct involvement in the Sendia massacre.

Memorial 
As of 2012, no initiatives were taken by the government to restore mass graves. Residential buildings have come up above two of the graves. The remaining four are also on the verge of destruction.

References 

1971 Bangladesh genocide
Massacres of Bengali Hindus in East Pakistan
1971 in Bangladesh
Madaripur District
Massacres in 1971
Massacres committed by Pakistan in East Pakistan
May 1971 events in Bangladesh